The Wembley Championships was a men's professional tennis tournament held from 1934–1990 with some periods of inactivity in between and is often considered to be one of the three Major professional tennis tournaments before the Open Era from 1927–1967 until the advent of the open era. Ken Rosewall's and Rod Laver's six singles titles are the record for this event. The tournament only had a men's draw.

It was first held in 1934 at the Empire Pool at Wembley Park, Wembley, north-west London. In 1968, it was titled the Jack Kramer Tournament of Champions. In 1970 it was the penultimate event on the Grand Prix Tennis Tour.

Name
It was officially called the Wembley Professional Championships, although it was later named the London Indoor Professional Championships. In 1968 it was titled the  Jack Kramer Tournament of Champions.

Past finals

Notes:

a1936 tournament was cancelled due to Tilden and Vines playing in Japan.  This was reported in London Daily Mail on August 24, 1936. There are sources that say Ellsworth Vines defeated Hans Nüsslein 6–4, 6–4, 6–2, but this must have been a different event.

bNo reports of a 1938 tournament in British newspapers (the Wembley event was always reported in major British newspapers).  Ray Bowers in an article on The Tennis Server website states there was no event held. There are sources that tell us Hans Nüsslein defeated Bill Tilden 7–5, 3–6, 6–3, 3–6, 6–2, but this must have been held elsewhere.

r1 For 1934, the tournament was played under Round Robin format with Vines 5-0 and Nüsslein 4-1 as final standings.

r1 For 1939, the tournament was played under Round Robin format with Budge 3-0 and Nüsslein, Tilden and Vines as 1-2 as final standings.

Doubles 

Source:

See also
 Wembley Professional Championships draws - Professional Era (1934–1967)
 U.S. Pro Tennis Championships
 French Pro Championship
 Major professional tennis tournaments before the Open Era

References

Bibliography 

 

 
Major tennis tournaments
Carpet court tennis tournaments
Defunct tennis tournaments in the United Kingdom
Grand Prix tennis circuit
Sport in the London Borough of Brent
Tennis tournaments in England
Recurring sporting events established in 1934
Recurring events disestablished in 1990
Professional tennis tournaments before the Open Era